The Opera Block was a historic building in Westville, Oklahoma.  The brick building was built in 1911–1912.  It was used for multiple purposes throughout its existence, serving commercial, government and entertainment functions.  For a time it served as the Westville City Hall. The second floor was configured as an opera house and auditorium.  It was added to the National Register of Historic Places in 1984 and was demolished in 1998.

References

Event venues on the National Register of Historic Places in Oklahoma
Opera houses on the National Register of Historic Places
Buildings and structures in Adair County, Oklahoma
Demolished buildings and structures in Oklahoma
National Register of Historic Places in Adair County, Oklahoma
1912 establishments in Oklahoma
Buildings and structures completed in 1912
1988 disestablishments in Oklahoma
Buildings and structures demolished in 1988